The 1998 World Weightlifting Championships were held in Lahti, Finland from November 7 to November 15. The women's competition in the middleweight (63 kg) division was staged on 12 November 1998.

Medalists

Records

Results

References
Results
Weightlifting World Championships Seniors Statistics, Page 13 

1998 World Weightlifting Championships
World